The 1969 DFB-Pokal Final decided the winner of the 1968–69 DFB-Pokal, the 26th season of Germany's knockout football cup competition. It was played on 14 June 1969 at the Waldstadion in Frankfurt. Bayern Munich won the match 2–1 against Schalke 04, to claim their 4th cup title.

Route to the final
The DFB-Pokal began with 32 teams in a single-elimination knockout cup competition. There were a total of four rounds leading up to the final. Teams were drawn against each other, and the winner after 90 minutes would advance. If still tied, 30 minutes of extra time was played. If the score was still level, a replay would take place at the original away team's stadium. If still level after 90 minutes, 30 minutes of extra time was played. If the score was still level, a drawing of lots would decide who would advance to the next round.

Note: In all results below, the score of the finalist is given first (H: home; A: away).

Match

Details

References

External links
 Match report at kicker.de 
 Match report at WorldFootball.net
 Match report at Fussballdaten.de 

FC Bayern Munich matches
FC Schalke 04 matches
1968–69 in German football cups
1969
Football in Frankfurt
Sports competitions in Frankfurt
June 1969 sports events in Europe
1960s in Frankfurt